Seychellaria is a genus of myco-heterotrophic plants in family Triuridaceae, native to Tanzania and to certain islands in the Indian Ocean.

 Seychellaria africana Vollesen - Mwanihana Forest Reserve in Tanzania
 Seychellaria madagascariensis C.H.Wright - Madagascar
 Seychellaria perrieri Schltr.  - Madagascar
 Seychellaria thomassetii Hemsl. - Mahé Island in the Seychelles

References

Pandanales genera
Parasitic plants
Triuridaceae